Malminkartano railway station is a railway station on the Helsinki commuter rail network located in northern Helsinki, Finland. It is located approximately eleven kilometres to the north of Helsinki Central railway station.

The station is served by circular lines I and P, between the stations of Kannelmäki and Myyrmäki.

History 

While most of the Martinlaakso line was opened in June 1975, Malminkartano was not one of its original stations as the suburbs around it were still under heavy construction around the time. The station was opened just under three years later, on 28 May 1978. It became the first station in the country to be located in a tunnel.

Trains initially stopped in the south side of the tunnel. As the construction of residential buildings in Malminkartano reached the plots north of the tunnel, the stopping point was moved to its midway point to function as a compromise between the original residents south of the tunnel and the new users of the station to its north.

In 1982, the tunnel's walls were painted with the country's first artistic graffiti, and then again in 1995 as part of a project with the participation of over 40 local artists. The works were eventually covered by illegally painted graffitis, which prompted the city of Helsinki to cover the entire wall with grey paint in 2004. The graffitis returned in October 2017 as part of a project arranged by the city, Helsinki City Transport and several other municipal actors, along with three sponsors from the paint industry.

External links

References 

Railway stations in Helsinki
Railway stations opened in 1978